Derrick Robins assembled a cricket team to tour Sri Lanka in October 1977, playing one first-class and one limited overs match versus the Sri Lanka Board President's XI in Colombo and an additional first-class match versus the Central Province Cricket Association President's XI in Kandy.

Both of the first-class matches were drawn while the tourists won the limited overs game.

The team was captained by Mike Denness and included several well-known players such as David Gower, Peter Willey, Harry Pilling, Intikhab Alam, Roger Tolchard, John Lever, Phil Carrick, Geoff Howarth, John Wright, Chris Cowdrey and John Emburey.

External sources
CricketArchive

References

Sources
 Wisden Cricketers Almanack 

1977 in English cricket
1977 in Sri Lankan cricket
English cricket tours of Sri Lanka
International cricket competitions from 1975–76 to 1980
Sri Lankan cricket seasons from 1972–73 to 1999–2000